Weißenstein is a town in the district of Villach-Land in the Austrian  state of Carinthia.

Geography
Weißenstein lies in the lower Drau valley northwest of Villach. The highest point in the municipality is the Spitzeck at 1517 m, and the lowest at 500 m.

Sights
The scenery around Weißenstein has been attracting artists for years, and their work is presented in the town's Wachaumuseum. The other main attraction is its Church of the Virgin Mary, on a hilltop to protect against the Turks.

References

External links

1604 disestablishments
States and territories established in 1540
Cities and towns in Villach-Land District
Gailtal Alps